This is the complete list of Asian Games medalists in table tennis from 1958 to 2018.

Events

Men's singles

Men's doubles

Men's team

Women's singles

Women's doubles

Women's team

Mixed doubles

References 
ITTF Database
List of medalists at Sports123.com

Table tennis
medalists

Asian Games